Canaan Hollow is a valley in Crawford County in the U.S. state of Missouri.

Canaan Hollow took its name from the local Canaan Cumberland Presbyterian Church.

References

Valleys of Crawford County, Missouri
Valleys of Missouri